Yavuz Özkan may refer to:

 Yavuz Özkan (director) (born 1942), Turkish film director
 Yavuz Özkan (footballer) (born 1985), Turkish footballer